Alcorta is a town (comuna) in the province of Santa Fe, Argentina.

Alcorta was founded in 1892 by Juan Bernardo Iturraspe and is best known as the starting point of the first large-scale agrarian strike in the history of Argentina, called the Grito de Alcorta, which began on 25 June 1912 and subsequently gave rise to the foundation of the Argentine Agrarian Federation.

Union leader José Ignacio Rucci was born in Alcorta.

References
 
 

Populated places in Santa Fe Province